Thoni or Thöni is a surname. Notable people with the surname include:

Dietmar Thöni (born 1968), Austrian alpine skier
Gustav Thöni (born 1951), Italian alpine ski racer
Reiner Thoni (born 1984), Canadian ski mountaineer 
Roland Thöni (1950–2021), Italian alpine ski racer